Shobeyshi-ye Kuchak (also Romanized as Shobeyshī-ye Kūchak) is a village in Jaffal Rural District, in the Central District of Shadegan County, Khuzestan Province, Iran. At the 2006 census, its population was 610, in 106 families.

References 

Populated places in Shadegan County